Alex Sceberras Trigona is a Maltese politician and diplomat. He is a Special Envoy to the Prime Minister of Malta, and the Permanent Representative of the Republic of Malta to the World Trade Organization. He served as Malta's Minister for Foreign Affairs from 1981 to 1987.

Early life

Family
Sceberras Trigona was born in Sliema in 1950. He is married to Joanna (née Borg). He has two daughters, Alexia and Angela.

Education
Sceberras Trigona was educated at the Lyceum, Malta, and the University of Malta, where he obtained his notarial diploma in 1972, and graduated Doctor of Laws in 1973. His Doctoral thesis was on Constitutional Change and the Maltese Constitution.

Career
He is a Visiting Senior Lecturer at the University of Malta where he lectures on Private International Law at the Faculty of Laws, and on Further Studies in Diplomacy and Legal Dimensions of Humanitarian Action at the Faculty of Arts.

He has practiced law in Malta as a Notary Public since 1976.

Foreign Affairs
Sceberras Trigona was Minister for Foreign Affairs from 1981 to 1987.

See also
List of current foreign ministers

References

1950 births
Living people
20th-century Maltese politicians
Foreign ministers of Malta
Labour Party (Malta) politicians
People from Sliema
University of Malta alumni
Academic staff of the University of Malta
Maltese notaries